Lask may refer to:

People
 Emil Lask, (1875-1915) German philosopher
 Berta Lask, (1878–1967) German writer
 Louis Jacobsohn-Lask, (1863–1941) German neurologist and neuroanatomist
 Abraham ben Samuel Cohen of Lask eighteenth century Jewish ascetic
 J. J. Lask, American writer

Places
 Łask, city in Poland, county seat of  Łask County, and seat of Gmina Łask
 Gmina Łask an administrative division in Łask County
 Łask County a county in Poland
 Łask railway station

Football teams
 ŽFK LASK, Serbian first class women's football team
 LASK Linz, Austrian football club
 LASK Juniors OÖ,  (2014-2018) a syndicated football team combining FC Juniors OÖ and the second team of LASK Linz